"Maria" is a song from the 1957 Broadway musical West Side Story, sung by the lead character Tony. The music was written by Leonard Bernstein and lyrics by Stephen Sondheim. The song was published in 1956.

"Maria" is sung by the male lead Tony when he learns the name of the girl he's fallen in love with is "Maria". The name "Maria" is spoken or sung in the song 30 times. The song was originally composed in E-flat major (following an 8 bar introduction in B major). In the 1961 and 2021 film adaptations, both introduction and chorus were lowered by a whole step. 

The song is widely known for its use of the melodic interval of a tritone in the main theme. The song is an example of the use of Lydian mode, which is the same as the major scale but with a raised 4th, giving the tritone characteristic of this piece.

Cover versions

 Peter Alexander
 Alfie Boe
 Andrea Bocelli
 Jimmy Bryant - provided Tony's singing voice in the 1961 film
 José Carreras
 Dave Brubeck – featured in Silver Linings Playbook
 Matt Cavenaugh
 George Chakiris
 Perry Como
 Michael Crawford – in a medley of West Side Story songs
 Vic Damone
 Plácido Domingo
 Jeff Duff
 Ansel Elgort – played Tony in the 2021 film
 Maynard Ferguson
 Sergio Franchi – on his 1964 RCA Victor Red Seal album Women in My Life
 Marvin Gaye
 The Gods
 Karel Gott
 Josh Groban
 David Habbin
 Jay and the Americans
 Udo Jürgens
 Ramin Karimloo
 Stan Kenton
 Larry Kert – original artist, he performed as Tony in the Broadway play
 Luis Mariano
 Johnny Mathis
 Matt Monro
 Julian Ovenden
 Gene Pitney
 P.J. Proby
 Buddy Rich
 Peter Tevis
 Sarah Vaughan
 Mark Vincent
 Il Volo
 Steve Watson
 Andy Williams
 Roger Williams
 Vittorio Grigolo 
 Ben Platt
 Jeremy Jordan
 Peter Cousens
 

It was also sampled in the song "Almost Like Praying" by Lin-Manuel Miranda.

References

1956 songs
Songs with music by Leonard Bernstein
Songs from West Side Story
Perry Como songs
Marvin Gaye songs
Jay and the Americans songs
Johnny Mathis songs
Gene Pitney songs
Ben Platt songs
Songs written by Stephen Sondheim